PI3 may refer to:
 Peptidase inhibitor 3
 Phosphorus triiodide
 Phosphoinositide 3-kinase
 PI3, a plasma injector developed and built by General Fusion